This article provides a list of media documents portraying Alzheimer's disease as a critical feature of the main plot:

1949 

 Death of a Salesman; While not mentioned in the script by name, Willy Loman exhibits many notable signs of the disease.

1981 
 Chillysmith Farm; This film documents the aging and death of a grandfather in the bosom of his family, so that he could live and die among the people he loved

1986 
 Sonia by Paule Baillargeon
 I Forget by SNFU released on If You Swear, You'll Catch No Fish

1987 
 An Alzheimer's Story This documentary provides the rare opportunity of following a family with an Alzheimer's victim for two years 
 The More We Get Together The More We Get Together gives insights into working with very old, disoriented, nursing home residents (Demented).
 No Place Like Home: Long Term Care For the Elderly Providing home care rather than institutionalized care is often less costly to the public and more desirable for the older person (including frail and demented).

1988 
 Aging in Soviet Georgia: A Toast to Sweet Old Age An in-depth look at the culture and experience of normal aging in the area of the world often called an "epicenter of longevity."

1990 

 Can't Afford to Grow Old The reality of aging is that there is no help in paying for a nurse or a housekeeper if you become disabled and need assistance

1992 
 Communicating With The "Alzheimer-Type" Population The two vignettes depicted in this video show typical examples of troublesome behavior in very old people who are disoriented

1993 
 Black Daisies for The Bride: A filmed play written by the poet Tony Harrison, based on the lives and experiences of people with Alzheimer's living in High Royds Hospital, Yorkshire. The play uses a combination of drama, documentary and music. The patients, their families and the staff play themselves, with the exception of a few professional actors.

1994 
 Complaints of a Dutiful Daughter by Deborah Hoffmann

1996 

 Forget Me Never When Diana McGowin got hopelessly lost driving home, she knew something was terribly wrong. Because she was only fifty-two, the doctors did not suspect Alzheimer's . After three years of tests they concluded she had a rare form called "early onset" which can strike victims as early as their thirties.

1997 
 ABC News Primetime Alzheimer's Dogs Meet Crystal, a dog who has the job of keeping tabs on her owner who has Alzheimer's Disease. Crystal was trained by a volunteer group called Okada in 1986 to provide hearing guide dogs for the deaf but has added Alzheimer's dogs as her latest project. Airdate: April 9, 1997

1998 
 The Safe House a 1998 film, portrays an aging spy having difficulties convincing people his information is not paranoia associated with Alzheimer's.

1999 
 Forget Me Never Canadian-American film  produced in 1999 
 The Caregiver, a book by Aaron Alterra (1999, Steerforth Press) about an elderly man detailing the progression of his wife's Alzheimer's, how he cared for her and the effect it had on his life. John Bayley, the husband of Iris Murdoch, who died of the disease in 1999, wrote of this book that it was "the best and most expert book on Alzheimer's that I have read and it should be closely studied by every caregiver."

2000 
 I Know A Song: A Journey With Alzheimer's Disease This documentary shows that Alzheimer's disease need not be the end of a loving relationship.
 The Chinese Hospice In Beijing stands the only hospital in China to specialize in allowing people approaching the end of their lives to die with dignity.
 "She Misses Him", written by Tim Johnson and performed by Tim Rushlow. The song is about an Alzheimer's victim.

2001 
 Iris, a film that depicts the story of Anglo-Irish novelist Iris Murdoch and her relationship with John Bayley. The film contrasts the start of their relationship and their later life, when Murdoch (played by Dame Judi Dench) was suffering from Alzheimer's disease. The film is based on Bayley's memoir Elegy for Iris.
 Amanda's Choice, a film that discusses  early-onset Alzheimer's, a much rarer form of the disease.
 Beautiful Memories (Se souvenir des belles choses), a French film about a young mother with early-onset Alzheimer's.

2002 
 Stolen Memories: Alzheimer's Disease A film by Rachel Stace and Rebecca Mellor. Filmed over ten months, Stolen Memories follows three people in their fifties who have been recently diagnosed with Alzheimer's disease.

2003 
 Age No Problem, a film about a company based in Needham, Massachusetts which only employs elderly staff members
 De zaak Alzheimer (2003).
 Dying at Grace (2003)
 A Song for Martin 
 Long Shadows: Stories from a Jewish Home, a film that examines the impact of institutionalizing the care of aging survivors of Holocaust who must transition to an old-age facility. Dementia, memory loss and physical immobility.

2004 
 The Forgetting: A Portrait of Alzheimer's (2004), a documentary aired on PBS
 A Moment to Remember is a Korean film which depicts the story of a young couple where the wife who has Alzheimer's.
 The Notebook, a film adaptation of Nicholas Sparks's book, depicts a woman with Alzheimer's and how her husband copes with the disease. Ryan Gosling and Rachel McAdams star.
 SONNY BOY is the story of the cross-country journey of Soleil Moon Frye, and her father, Virgil Frye, who is suffering from Alzheimer's disease.

2005 
 The first three seasons of the TV series Grey's Anatomy featured a running subplot of Meredith Grey's struggle, first to keep her mother's (Ellis Grey) Alzheimer's a secret, and then to cope with her mother's disease as her state worsened.
 Thanmathra (Malayalam:Molecule) (2005) is an Indian Malayalam film directed by Blessy which portrays the effects of Alzheimer's disease on the life of an individual and his family.
 "Memory for Max, Claire, Ida and Company" (2005)

2006 
 Memories of Tomorrow The 2006 Japanese film, starring Ken Watanabe, tells a story of a 49-year-old man suffering from Alzheimer's disease and burden of care put on his wife.
 Away From Her (2006) is English Canadian actor Sarah Polley's directorial debut. The film is based on Alice Munro's short story "The Bear Came Over the Mountain", from the 2001 collection "Hateship, Friendship, Courtship, Loveship, Marriage". The film stars Gordon Pinsent and Julie Christie as a couple whose marriage is tested when Christie's character begins to suffer from Alzheimer's and moves into a nursing home, where she loses virtually all memory of her husband and begins to develop a romance with another nursing home resident.
 Zulene: Lady in Red (2006)
 Family Matters: Coming Together for Alzheimer's 
 Christine and Paul- A Journey With Alzheimer's Disease Christine, a 46-year-old mother of three, with a distinguished career in science, was diagnosed with Alzheimer's disease. Recently divorced from an abusive husband, the news sent her into a tailspin, and was emotionally devastating for her daughters, as well. Three years after her diagnosis, she met Paul Bryden, a former diplomat. Despite her diagnosis, they fell in love and married; two super achievers, with one embarking on an inevitable journey of decline.

2007 
 Malcolm and Barbara — A Love Story (1999) TV documentaries and Malcolm and Barbara: Love’s Farewell (2007), featured Malcolm Pointon who was diagnosed with Alzheimer's at the age of 51. Over a period of 14 years Paul Watson followed Malcolm and Barbara Pointon's lives. The documentary follows the couple as Malcolm succumbs to the disease and shows the harsh reality faced by caregivers. The 2007 programme was the target of controversy when initial media claims that the finale purported to show Malcolm's death from the disease, but insider sources revealed that in the closing shots of the documentary actually show Malcolm slipping into a coma from which he never recovered. The argument overshadowed the importance of the documentary, and when it aired on 8 August 2007 the narrator informs us that "Malcolm is in a coma, and dies three days later."
 Away From Her Released 2007 
 An ihrer Seite 
 And Then There Were Four The film depicts such a situation as we see the daily life of a frail 77- year-old grandmother who is raising four grandsons aged 5–8 
 The BBC radio soap opera The Archers has had a long-running subplot about the development of the character Jack Woolley Alzheimer's disease, winning a Mental Health Media Award in 2007.
 Still Alice, a novel by Lisa Genova, depicts Alice Howland, a 50-year-old linguistics professor coping with early onset Alzheimer's

2008 
 Terry Pratchett Documentaries, In April 2008, the BBC began working with Terry Pratchett to make a documentary series based on his illness. The first part (of two) was broadcast on BBC Two on the 4th of February 2009.
 "Mum and Me" a BBC documentary made by Sue Bourne about her mothers Alzheimer's
 U, Me aur Hum (translates as: You, me and us) a 2008 Bollywood film, with Kajol Devgan playing an Alzheimer's disease patient.
 Ruth's Locket  Alzheimer's Short Film, Summer 2008 
 The Alzheimer Sea Exploring the slow erosion of personality that this disease inflicts
 Annie Girardot, ainsi va la vie, a 2008 documentary film by Nicolas Baulieu
 Choke, a 2008 film by Clark Gregg

2009 
 The Alzheimer's Project films The Alzheimer's Project consists of a series of 4 films. The anchor of the series is Momentum in Science which features 25 leading scientists, a primetime state-of-the-science report revealing the most cutting-edge research advances. The three additional primetime specials (The Memory Lost Tapes; Grandpa, Will You Remember Me? with Maria Shriver; and Caregivers) capture what it means to experience the disease, to be a child or grandchild of one who suffers, and to care for those who are affected. The project includes four documentaries, 15 short films, a book, a community outreach program and a website
 Forgetful Not Forgotten
 You Are Here, film
 I Remember Better When I Paint is a 2009 international documentary inspired by the story of Hilda Goldblatt Gorenstein (Hilgos) that focuses on how the creative arts can help Alzheimer's patients re-engage in life.  The film is narrated by Academy Award winning actress Olivia de Havilland. Featured in the documentary is Yasmin Aga Khan, president of Alzheimer's Disease International and daughter of Rita Hayworth, who had Alzheimer's. The French version of the film "Je me souviens mieux quand je peins" was released in September 2009 as part of French Alzheimer Association's awareness raising activities on World Alzheimer's Day. The film is co-directed by Eric Ellena and Berna Huebner
 Alzheimer's Disease: Facing the Facts received the 2009 Boston/New England Emmy award
 I Forgot to Tell You by Omar Sharif
 L'oeil de Verre, a film by Fréderick Compain about the work of William Utermohlen, (in Paris)
 Living With Alzheimer's 
 Going Home
 Facing the Facts won a regional Emmy in May
 Is There Anybody There  about a very funny and very touching relationship between an old man who was sent to an old people's home for his final days and a young boy who is stuck there because his parents own it.
 Lick Salt A Grandson's Tale, Ryan has been out of touch with his family, and especially his grandmother whom he has not seen in fifteen years... until his grandfather's funeral reconnects them. She is lonely though feisty, and suffering from dementia.

2010 
 Dear Dad, documentary short about former Philadelphia Eagles football player Pete Pihos as he battles Alzheimer's.
 Schism 
 Egyptian Actor Adel Emam performed a comedy film entitled Alzheimer's it was released in November 2010.
 Alain Delon is Shooting a film about Alzheimer's disease.
 L'Absence 
 Dementia With Dignity
 Alzheimer: ¿y tu quien eres? 
 Telling It Like It Is an intimate look at the life and work of American born painter William Utermohlen
 Behrooz Afkhami is Directing a film about Alzheimer's disease entitled: This is not my house.
 "Raymond", co-written and recorded by Brett Eldredge, is also about an Alzheimer's patient.
 Raising Hope, a television comedy depicting an extended family revolving around a 23-year-old and his baby, his adult parents, and his grandmother who has dementia.
 Inside My Being a short film by Roberto Carlo Chiesa, shown from the point-of-view and told by the voice of an Alzheimer's patient.
 Barney's Version is a film based on the novel of the same name where the story is told from the main character's perspective. Throughout the story he is developing Alzheimer's and is diagnosed with the disease.
 The film Poetry is a story of a suburban woman in her 60s who begins to grow an interest for poetry while struggling with Alzheimer's disease and her irresponsible grandson.
 The comic Tangles. A Story about Alzheimer's, my mother and me by Sarah Leavitt is an autobiographic account of the author's experience before and during her mother's struggle with Alzheimer's disease.

2011 
 Before We Forget, a film about Joyce Fernandez, a 50-year-old woman caring for her mother Celine, who has had Alzheimer's Disease for 7 years, and Dr Irene Giam (PhD), a former mathematics tutor and atheist with strong views about death in the face of terminal illness. Directed by two Singaporean youths, this hour-long film is an observational documentary about two women with dementia who live in an Asian society where terminal illnesses and dying remain taboo.
 Arrugas (English: Wrinkles), an animated film, based on a Spanish comic book, about a man who faces Alzheimer's, and his newfound life in an elderly care facility.
 Rise of the Planet of the Apes, a film in which a scientist in San Francisco seeks a cure for his father's Alzheimer's disease. He tests a promising drug on chimpanzees, significantly enhancing their cognitive abilities and leading to unintended consequences.
 An Empty Bliss Beyond This World, an album by English musician Leyland James Kirby, based on a study regarding people with Alzheimer's disease being able to remember music they listened to when they were younger, as well as where they were and how they felt when they listened to it.

2012 
 A Good Man, a book about Sargent Shriver written by his son Mark, 1st President of the Peace Corps, who had Alzheimer's
 I Remember, a published song recorded by Tish Tindall to help raise awareness of Alzheimer's in Scotland. The single was launched in February and later was released as a single on 2 March 2012.  The project has been fully supported by Alzheimer's Scotland.

First Cousin Once Removed, by filmmaker Alan Berliner. A documentary feature film about Edwin Honig and Honig's loss of memory due to Alzheimer's.

2013 
 Mai, a 2013 Bollywood Hindi language film showed the title character, played by Asha Bhosle, to be a 65-year-old woman suffering from Alzheimer's disease.
 Stacey Solomon won a jackpot of £20,000 on the ITV quiz show Tipping Point: Lucky Stars for the announced benefit of Alzheimer's Research UK.
 The Genius of Marian is a documentary about a mother and daughter with Alzheimer's.

2014 
 Still Alice, a film adaptation of Lisa Genova's 2007 novel, starring Julianne Moore as Alice.
 The Taking of Deborah Logan, a found footage horror film about a woman with Alzheimer's who becomes possessed.
 Head Full of Honey, a German drama film directed by Til Schweiger.
 "I'm Not Gonna Miss You", co-written and recorded by Glen Campbell, is also about his own diagnosis of Alzheimer's disease and his future living with the disease. The song won "Best Country Song" at the 2015 Grammy Awards.
 Whisper If I Forget, a Turkish film about a woman with Alzheimer’s returning to her childhood home where she remembers her old days of climbing the stairs of fame and fortune while trying to deal with her older sister who holds her responsible for her ruined life.

2016 
Godhi Banna Sadharana Mykattu, 2015 Indian Kannada film directed by Hemanth Rao deals with a middle-aged person suffering from Alzheimer's disease.
 Between 2016 and 2019, British electronic musician and composer Leyland James Kirby released a group of six albums named Everywhere at the End of Time under the moniker “The Caretaker”. Each album musically depicts a specific stage of Alzheimer’s Disease: the albums are known for their nostalgic and unsettling mood. The project also became a popular Internet meme.

2017 
Coco, 2017 Pixar Animation Studios film directed by Lee Unkrich. Though it is never explicitly stated, the titular character Mamá Coco displays multiple symptoms of Alzheimer's and very likely has the disease.
Logan, 2017 X-Men film directed by James Mangold depicts Charles Xavier (Patrick Stewart) having Alzheimer's disease.

2018 

 Head Full of Honey, an American remake of 2014 German film of the same name with Nick Nolte, Matt Dillon, Emily Mortimer, Jacqueline Bisset and Greta Scacchi.
 Judgement (video game) plot centers around various murders which are connected to the development of a potential cure to Alzheimer's.

2019 

 The Italian journalist and author Michela Farabella published the autobiographical novel Italo, con te partiro in 2019 (Edizione Carello), in which she tells the tale of woe of her father Italo Farabella, who was seriously affected by Alzheimer's disease in old age. Michela Farabella combines the portrayal of the tragic story of her father's four-year odyssey in Turin between homes for dementia patients and hospitals with criticism of the Italian health system for its treatment of elderly Alzheimer's patients.

2020 

 Anthony Hopkins stars in the film The Father, Florian Zeller's directorial debut. Based on Zeller's 2012 play Le Père, it is co-written by Christopher Hampton and is the second adaptation of the play following 2015's Floride. Sir Anthony Hopkins depicts a Welshman living with progressive Alzheimer's disease in his London flat, Olivia Colman portrays his daughter, and Mark Gatiss, Imogen Poots, Rufus Sewell, and Olivia Williams also star.

Unknown date 
 Grace is a documentary that profiles the life of Grace Kirkland, beginning shortly after her diagnosis of Alzheimer's disease and ending at her death seven years later. The documentary tracks Grace through the progression of her symptoms and the changing role of her caregiver husband, Glenn Kirkland. This Whiteford-Hadary production was aired on American public television stations in 1991 and has received a regional Emmy Award (1992).
 The Forgetting: A Portrait of Alzheimer's is an Emmy award winner. (2006?)
 My Name Is Lisa A Short Film About Alzheimer's Disease
 Grandpa, Do You Know Who I Am? 
 Quick Brown Fox 
 Tracy and Jess: Living With Early Onset Alzheimer's
 Three Bagel Sunday is an account of life inside the Traditions Alzheimer's & Dementia Care Unit
 Understanding Alzheimer's Disease
 Diminished Capacity with Alan Alda and Matthew Broderick
 La Boîte de Pandore
 Stuff, about men losing fathers
 Alzheimer's Disease: Inside Looking Out by Terra Nova

References 

Media
Fiction about diseases and disorders
Works about mental disorders